The Mölltaler Polinik, at , is the highest mountain of the Kreuzeck group, a southern part of the High Tauern range in the Austrian state of Carinthia.

Geography

The peak rises south of the villages of Flattach and Obervellach in the Möll Valley. From Obervellach a footpath leads past the Polinikhaus lodge (run by Mölltal Section of the Austrian Alpine Club) to the summit. 

See also 
 Gailtaler Polinik

Literature 
Manfred Posch: Reißeck, Kreuzeck. Die schönsten Touren, Klagenfurt, 2000, Kärntner Druck- und Verlagsgesellschaft m.b.H., 

Mountains of the Alps
Mountains of Carinthia (state)
Two-thousanders of Austria
Kreuzeck group